The 25th Avenue station is a local station on the BMT West End Line of the New York City Subway, located in Brooklyn at the intersection of 25th Avenue and 86th Street, on the border of the Bensonhurst, Bath Beach, and Gravesend neighborhoods of Brooklyn. This station is served by the D train at all times.

History 

25th Avenue opened on July 29, 1916, as the terminal station of an extension of the BMT West End Line from 18th Avenue. With the completion of the line to Coney Island on July 21, 1917, this station ceased to be the line's terminus.

The line was originally a surface excursion railway to Coney Island, called the Brooklyn, Bath and Coney Island Railroad, which was established in 1862, but did not reach Coney Island until 1864. Under the Dual Contracts of 1913, an elevated line was built over New Utrecht Avenue, 86th Street and Stillwell Avenue, replacing the surface railway.

In the 1980s, this station was adopted by students of Lafayette High School as part of New York City Transit's "Adopt a Station" program.

In 2012, the station was rehabilitated with funding from the American Recovery and Reinvestment Act of 2009.

The 2012 artwork at this station is Rediscovery by Amy Cheng. It is composed of four laminated glass windscreens of imaginary land- and skyscapes.

Station layout

This elevated station has three tracks and two side platforms. The center express track is not normally used. This station has four stairs to the street and one from the mezzanine to each platform.

Exits
The station's only exits are from a mezzanine beneath the tracks. From there, stairways lead to all four corners of 86th Street and 25th Avenue.

In popular culture
The station was pictured in the 1971 film The French Connection.

References

External links 

 
 Station Reporter — D Train
 25th Avenue entrance from Google Maps Street View
 Platforms from Google Maps Street View

BMT West End Line stations
New York City Subway stations in Brooklyn
Railway stations in the United States opened in 1916
1916 establishments in New York City